The Church of St Peter and St Paul dominates the village of Bleadon, Somerset, England.

It was built in the 14th century (dedicated in 1317), being restored and the chancel shortened in the mid 19th century. It is a Grade I listed building.

The tower, which has been dated to around 1390, contains five bells dating from 1711 and made by Edward Bilbie of the Bilbie family, and one from 1925 by the Whitechapel Bell Foundry.

The interior of the church includes a Norman tub font and a pulpit dating from about 1460. The Sweetland organ dates from 1893 and was moved to its present position in 1956. The stained glass window is from 1964.

The Anglican parish is part of the Bleadon benefice within the archdeaconry of Bath.

See also

 List of Grade I listed buildings in North Somerset
 List of towers in Somerset
 List of ecclesiastical parishes in the Diocese of Bath and Wells

References

External links
 Church of St Peter & St Paul, Bleadon

Buildings and structures completed in 1317
14th-century church buildings in England
Church of England church buildings in North Somerset
Grade I listed churches in Somerset
Grade I listed buildings in North Somerset